is a railway station on the Tadami Line in the city of Aizuwakamatsu, Fukushima Prefecture, Japan, operated by East Japan Railway Company (JR East). Nishi-Wakamatsu Station is located southwest of the center of Aizuwakamatsu.

Lines
Nishi-Wakamatsu Station is served by the Tadami Line, and is located 3.1 rail kilometers from the official starting point of the line at Aizu-Wakamatsu Station. It is also served by the Aizu Railway Aizu Line, of which it is the official terminus; however, most Aizu Line trains continue to Aizu-Wakamatsu Station.

Station layout

Nishi-Wakamatsu Station has a single side platform and a single island platform connected by a footbridge. The station is staffed.

Platforms

History
The station was absorbed into the JR East network upon the privatization of the JNR on April 1, 1987. A new station building was completed September 28, 2005.

Passenger statistics
In fiscal 2019, the JR portion of the station was used by an average of 586 passengers daily (boarding passengers only).

The passenger statistics for previous years are below.

Surrounding area
 Aizuwakamatsu Castle
 Wakamatsu-Zaimokumachi post office
 Aizuwakamatsu weather station
 Jyōsai Elementary School
 Aizuwakamatsu fourth Junior High School
 Aizu Senior High School 

 Fukushima Prefectural Route 59
 Fukushima Prefectural Route 211
 Fukushima Prefectural Route 328

See also
 List of railway stations in Japan

External links

 JR East Station information 
  Aizu Railway Station information

References

Railway stations in Japan opened in 1934
Railway stations in Fukushima Prefecture
Tadami Line
Aizu Line
Railway stations in Japan opened in 1926
Aizuwakamatsu